Salé is a city in northwestern Morocco, on the right bank of the Bou Regreg river, opposite the national capital Rabat, for which it serves as a commuter town. Founded in about 1030 by the Banu Ifran, it later became a haven for pirates in the 17th century as an independent republic before being incorporated into Alaouite Morocco.

The city's name is sometimes transliterated as Salli or Sallee. The National Route 6 connects it to Fez and Meknes in the east and the N1 to Kénitra in the north-east. It recorded a population of 890,403 in the 2014 Moroccan census.

History

The Phoenicians established a settlement called Sala, later the site of a Roman colony, Sala Colonia, on the south side of the Bou Regreg estuary.

It is sometimes confused with Salé, on the opposite north bank. Salé was founded in about 1030 by Arabic-speaking Berbers who apparently cultivated the legend that the name was derived from that of Salah, son of Ham, son of Noah.

The Banu Ifran Berber dynasty began construction of a mosque about the time the city was founded. The present-day Great Mosque of Salé was built during the 12th-century reign of the Almohad sultan Abu Yaqub Yusuf, although not completed until 1196. During the 17th century, Rabat was known as New Salé, or Salé la neuve (in French), as it expanded beyond the ancient city walls to include the Chellah, which had become a fortified royal necropolis under the rule of Abu Yaqub Yusuf's son, Abu Yusuf Yaqub al-Mansur.

In September 1260, Salé was raided and occupied by warriors sent in a fleet of ships by King Alfonso X of Castile. After the victory of the Marinid dynasty, the historic Bab el-Mrissa was constructed by the Sultan Abu Yusuf Yaqub ibn Abd Al-Haqq which remains as a landmark of the city.

Republic of Salé

In the 17th century, Salé became a haven for Barbary pirates, among them the Moriscos expelled from Spain turned corsairs, who formed an independent Republic of Salé. Salé pirates (the well-known "Salé Rovers") roamed the seas, and cruised the shipping routes between Atlantic colonial ports and Europe, seizing ships from the Americas and Europe for goods and captives. They sold their crews and sometimes passengers into slavery in the Arabic world. Despite the legendary reputation of the Salé corsairs, their ships were based across the river in Rabat, called "New Salé" by the English.

European powers took action to try to eliminate the threat from the Barbary Coast. On 20 July 1629, the city of Salé was bombarded by French Admiral Isaac de Razilly with a fleet composed of the ships Licorne, Saint-Louis, Griffon, Catherine, Hambourg, Sainte-Anne, Saint-Jean; his forces destroyed three corsair ships.

20th-century socio-political development
During the decades preceding the independence of Morocco, Salé was the stronghold of some "national movement" activists. The reading of the "Latif" (a politically charged prayer to God, read in mosques in loud unison) was launched in Salé and became popular in some cities of Morocco.

A petition against the so-called "Berber Dahir" (a decree that allowed some Berber-speaking areas of Morocco to continue using Berber Law, as opposed to Sharia Law) was given to Sultan Mohamed V and the Resident General of France. The petition and the "Latif" prayer led to the withdrawal and adjustment of the so-called "Berber Decree" of May 1930. The activists who opposed the "Berber Decree" apparently feared that the explicit recognition of the Berber Customary Law (a very secular-minded Berber tradition) would threaten the position of Islam and its Sharia law system. Others believed that opposing the French-engineered "Berber Decree" was a means to turn the table against the French occupation of Morocco.

The widespread storm that was created by the "Berber Dahir" controversy created a somewhat popular Moroccan nationalist elite based in Salé and Fez; it had strong anti-Berber, anti-West, anti-secular, and pro  Arab-Islamic inclinations. This period helped develop the political awareness and activism that would lead fourteen years later to the signing of the Manifest of Independence of Morocco on 11 January 1944 by many "Slawi" activists and leaders. Salé has been deemed to have been the stronghold of the Moroccan left for many decades, where many leaders have resided.

Culture
Salé has played a rich and important part in Moroccan history.  The first demonstrations for independence against the French, for example, began in Salé. Numerous government officials, decision makers, and royal advisers of Morocco have been from Salé. Salé people, the Slawis, have always had a "tribal" sense of belonging, a sense of pride that developed into a feeling of superiority towards the "berranis", i.e. Outsiders.

Subdivisions
The prefecture is divided administratively into the following:

Climate

Salé has a Mediterranean climate (Csa) with warm to hot dry summers and mild damp winters. Located along the Atlantic Ocean, Salé has a mild, temperate climate, shifting from cool in winter to warm days in the summer months. The nights are always cool (or cold in winter, it can reach Sub  sometimes), with daytime temperatures generally rising about +7/8 C° (+15/18 F°). The winter highs typically reach only  in December–February. Rabat belongs to the sub-humid bioclimatic zone with an average annual precipitation of 560 mm.

Salé's climate resembles that of the southwest coast of the Iberian Peninsula and the coast of Southern California.

Modern city

Recent developments, including the new bridge connecting to Rabat, the new Rabat-Salé tramway, marina and coastal development demonstrate government investment. Private development companies such as Emaar Properties are also investing in the area.
High unemployment used to be a serious issue to the Salé area, with the numerous textile factories located in this area being the only real source of work, this is recently diversing into other areas such as international call centres, electronics and recently a new "techno park" was opened, which was modeled on the Casablanca techno centre success.

Water supply and wastewater collection in Salé was  irregular, with poorer and illegal housing units suffering the highest costs and most acute scarcities. Much of the city used to rely upon communal standpipes, which were often shut down, depriving some neighbourhoods of safe drinking water for indefinite periods of time. Nevertheless, Salé fared better than inland Moroccan locations, where water scarcity was even more acute. Improvements from the government, local businesses and the water distribution companies of Régie de distribution d'Eau & d'Électricité de Rabat-Salé (REDAL)  have meant that this situation has improved drastically.

Sports
In December 2017, AS Salé became Africa's basketball club Champion. It was the first continental crown in the club's history.

The A.S.S. is the football club of the city, and the president is Abderrahmane Chokri.

Transport

Air 

Salé's main airport is Rabat–Salé Airport, which is located in Salé but also serves Rabat, the capital city of Morocco.

Trains 
Salé is served by two principal railway stations run by the national rail service, the ONCF. These stations are Salé-Tabriquet and Salé-Ville.

Salé-Ville is the main inter-city station, from which trains run south to Rabat, Casablanca, Marrakech and El Jadida, north to Tanger, or east to Meknes, Fes, Taza and Oujda.

Tram 

The Rabat-Salé tramway was put into service on May 23, 2011. It is operated by Veolia Transdev with Alstom Citadis trams.

In popular culture
The film Black Hawk Down was partially filmed in Salé, in particular the wide angle aerial shots with helicopters flying down the coastline.

The character Robinson Crusoe, in the early part of Daniel Defoe's novel by the same name, spends time in captivity of the local pirates, the Salé Rovers, and at last sails off to liberty from the mouth of the Salé river - an adventure less well remembered than the protagonist's later sojourn on the desert island.

Notable residents
Abdellah Taïa, writer
Abdelwahed Radi, politician
Abu Zakariya Yahya al-Wattasi, governor of Salé for the Marinids
Ahmad ibn Khalid al-Nasiri, historian
Ahmed al-Salawi, writer
Amina Benkhadra, politician
Amine Laâlou, athlete
Chaim ibn Attar, world renowned biblical commentator, talmudist, and posek known for his work "Or HaChayim" on the Pentateuch
Gnawi, rapper
Hajj Ali Zniber, writer
Hayat Lambarki, athlete
Houcine Slaoui, musician
Larbi Naji, footballer
El Mehdi Malki, judoka
Merouane Zemmama, footballer
Mohamed Amine Sbihi, politician
Mohammed Zniber, writer and historian
Nores (musician), Rapper
Raphael Ankawa, Chief Rabbi of Morocco and a noted commentator, talmudist, posek, and author
Reda Rhalimi, basketball player
Saad Hassar, politician
Tarik Khbabez, kickboxer

Twin towns – sister cities

Salé is twinned with:

 Aryanah, Tunisia
 Beitunia, Palestine
 Gandiaye, Senegal
 Grand Yoff, Senegal
 Maroua, Cameroon
 Portalegre, Portugal

Partner cities
Salé also cooperates with:
 Alexandria, United States
 Sochi, Russia
 Tlaxcala, Mexico

See also
 Bouknadel
 Le Bouregreg

References

External links

 Salé entry in LexicOrient
 Le portail de la ville de Salé
 

Prefecturial capitals in Morocco